Hermanus Christoffel Beukes (also known as Oom Maans Beukes) (born 20 June 1913 in Rehoboth, German South-West Africa – died 22 July 2004 in Rehoboth, Namibia) was a Coloured Namibian politician and activist. Beukes was a frequent petitioner of the United Nations because of Apartheid South Africa's actions while Namibia was held under its mandate.

Abduction
Beukes was in a group of Namibians who fled to neighboring Botswana in 1963. Alongside Kenneth Abrahams, Andreas Shipanga and fellow Baster Paul Smit, the group fled the country because of their actions in recruiting soldiers for SWAPO's military wing, the People's Liberation Army of Namibia. South African agents in Botswana abducted the foursome and returned them to Namibia. Following international pressure regarding the illegality of state-sponsored kidnapping, South Africa returned the four to Botswana. Intending to travel to New York City to petition the United Nations for Namibia in person, Beukes could not adjust to the changed environment and returned to Rehoboth. In Rehoboth, Beukes was a shoemaker.

See also
List of kidnappings

References

1913 births
2004 deaths
Coloured Namibian people
Formerly missing people
Kidnapped Namibian people
Kidnapped politicians
Kidnappings in Botswana
People from Rehoboth, Namibia
SWAPO politicians